Jack Carty may refer to:

Jack Carty (cricketer), Irish cricketer
Jack Carty (musician) (born 1987), Australian musician
Jack Carty (rugby union) (born 1992), rugby union player from Ireland

See also
John Carty (disambiguation)